Radek Petr (born 24 February 1987) is a Czech footballer who plays as a goalkeeper and is currently free agent.

Club career
Petr started his career at hometown club Baník Ostrava. In August 2007, he signed a 4-year contract with Serie A side Parma for undisclosed fees, as 3rd keeper behind Luca Bucci and Nicola Pavarini, along with Fabio Virgili and Eros Corradini. After the relegation of Parma, he was loaned to Lega Pro Prima Divisione side Pro Patria.

In January 2009, he was loaned to Eupen at Belgian Second Division. In July 2009, his loan was extended and with option to buy in 2010. Eventually Eupen signed him for free.

International career
Petr was the first choice keeper for Czech U20 at 2007 FIFA U-20 World Cup. He also played at 2006 UEFA European Under-19 Football Championship as one of the starting XI.

Honours
Czech Rupublic U-21
FIFA U-20 World Cup runner-up (1) 2007

References

External links
 
 Profile at FC Zbrojovka Brno official site
 
 Profile at FAČR

1987 births
Living people
Sportspeople from Ostrava
Czech footballers
Czech Republic youth international footballers
Czech expatriate footballers
Parma Calcio 1913 players
K.A.S. Eupen players
PFC Ludogorets Razgrad players
Association football goalkeepers
Expatriate footballers in Italy
Expatriate footballers in Belgium
Expatriate footballers in Bulgaria
FC Zbrojovka Brno players
Czech First League players
Belgian Pro League players
Challenger Pro League players
Serie C players
First Professional Football League (Bulgaria) players